Plumbing Manufacturers International (PMI) is an industry association for manufacturers of plumbing products. Its members make 90% of the plumbing products sold in North America. Its headquarters is in Rolling Meadows, Illinois.

Role
The association aims to advocate for its members, with representatives in Washington, D.C. and in several US states to monitor legislation at the federal, state and local levels to ensure public health and safety, water efficiency and product performance. It also aims to act as a source of industry and market information, and as a coordinating and decision-making body for dealing with industry issues, including the development and maintenance of codes and standards.

To provide advocacy for its members and the industry in regulatory and legislative matters, PMI staff are represented on National Association of Home Builders' Leading Suppliers Council and the United States Environmental Protection Agency (EPA) group Water Sense Partners, which aim to develop and maintain codes and standards. PMI members have access to the International Trade Administration of the United States Department of Commerce through ITAC/9, which focuses on Fair Trade issues. In addition to domestic alliances, PMI has formal agreements with the Bathroom Manufacturers Association in the UK, the Canadian Institute of Plumbing and Heating and the Plumbing Products Industry Group in Australia.

PMI hosts conferences and training workshops throughout the year.

Membership
Membership in PMI is open to global manufacturers of plumbing industry products including potable water supply system components, fixture fittings, waste fixture fittings, fixtures, flushing devices, sanitary drainage system components, and plumbing appliances, which are marketed and sold within the territorial limits of United States and Canada. In 2012, PMI opened its membership to plumbing materials and components suppliers and certifier organizations through its Allied Membership program.

History
In existence since the 1960s when it was known as the Plumbing Brass Institute (PBI), the organization’s scope was expanded in 1975 and the name changed to the Plumbing Manufacturers Institute (PMI). In 1998, it was reorganized around focus issues, product groups and standing committees and moved from a management company to a stand-alone organization with a dedicated staff. In 2010, it  changed its name to Plumbing Manufacturers International to reflect its expanded scope.

SafePlumbing.org
PMI is the owner of an educational website which serves as a clearinghouse for information about plumbing fixtures and fittings, as well as information about clean water, water efficiency and bathroom safety. The site provides a glossary of plumbing industry terms and a directory of North American plumbing product markings.

References

External links
Plumbing Manufacturers International

Trade associations based in the United States
Manufacturing trade associations
Organizations based in Illinois
Plumbing organizations